"You're the Best Thing" is a song by English band the Style Council which was their sixth single to be released. It was composed by lead singer Paul Weller, recorded at Weller's own studio Solid Bond Studios, and was released in 1984. It is the second single from the band's début album, Café Bleu (1984). Café Bleu was renamed My Ever Changing Moods in the United States to capitalise on the success of the first single.

Versions
The 7-inch single version of the song adds a saxophone solo that is not present in the original album version.  Certain editions of the My Ever Changing Moods album in the U.S. feature this single version in place of the full-length album version that appeared on all editions of Café Bleu.

In the UK and Australasia, the song was released as a Double A-sided single with "The Big Boss Groove". Both the 7-inch and 12-inch formats were officially titled 'Groovin'", although edited versions of both songs appeared on the 7-inch release.

Compilation appearances
As well as the song's single release, it has featured on various compilation albums released by The Style Council. The song was included on The Singular Adventures of The Style Council, The Complete Adventures of The Style Council, and Greatest Hits.

Music video
The music video for "You're the Best Thing" was directed by Tim Pope.

Track listings
 7-inch single (UK)
 "You're The Best Thing" — 4:18
 "The Big Boss Groove" — 3:40

 12-inch single (UK)
 "You're The Best Thing" (Long Version) — 5:41
 "You're The Dub Thing" — 4:58
 "The Big Boss Groove" — 4:39

Charts

Weekly charts

Year-end charts

Certifications

References

1984 songs
1984 singles
The Style Council songs
Songs written by Paul Weller
Polydor Records singles
Soul ballads
1980s ballads
Music videos directed by Tim Pope